D'Orazio is a surname of central Italian origin, found primarily in the regions of Abruzzo and Lazio. 

The name 'D'Orazio' is derived from the Latin Horatius, Horace in English, and means 'clairvoyant'.

Many alternatives of the name have arisen due to immigration to English speaking countries and subsequent  Anglicization and phonetic spelling.
Such alternatives include, Dorazio, Dorazzio, Diorazio, Deorazio, Doraazio, Doriazio, and D'Orzaio.

Notable people with the surname include:

John D'Orazio (1955–2011), Australian politician
Matt D'Orazio (born 1976), American football player
Sante D'Orazio (born 1956), American photographer
Valerie D'Orazio (born 1974), American comic book writer
Piero Dorazio, Italian painter
Carolyn D'Orazio, Canadian floral designer
Elise D’Orazio (born 1984), American actor/filmmaker

See also
Orazio